Avanti Popolo is a 1986 Israeli drama film directed by Rafi Bukai. The film was selected as the Israeli entry for the Best Foreign Language Film at the 59th Academy Awards, but was not accepted as a nominee.

The film's name is derived from the opening words of the Italian revolutionary song Bandiera Rossa, which is sung by the film's protagonists, Israeli and Egyptian soldiers wandering the Sinai Desert in the aftermath of the  1967 War.

Cast
 Salim Dau as Haled el Asmar
 Suhel Haddad as Gassan Hamada
 Tuvia Gelber as David Pozner
 Danny Segev as Yaacov Hirsh
 Dani Roth as Dani Sela
 Barry Langford as English Journalist
 Michael Koresh as Military Attache

See also
 List of submissions to the 59th Academy Awards for Best Foreign Language Film
 List of Israeli submissions for the Academy Award for Best Foreign Language Film

References

External links
 

1986 films
1986 drama films
Israeli drama films
1980s Arabic-language films